Duane Stark is an American politician. A member of the Republican Party from southern Oregon, he was elected to succeed his party's 2014 gubernatorial nominee, Dennis Richardson, in the Oregon House of Representatives from District 4. He took office in January 2015 as one of two new state representatives from Grants Pass, together with Carl Wilson.

Personal life
Stark lives in Grants Pass with his wife Dusti and their five children. He holds degrees from the University of Oregon and Multnomah University. He is a pastor at River Valley Church in Grants Pass. He also has a background in nonprofit work.

References

External links
 Campaign website
 Legislative website

Living people
Republican Party members of the Oregon House of Representatives
Oregon clergy
Multnomah University alumni
University of Oregon alumni
Year of birth missing (living people)
People from Grants Pass, Oregon
21st-century American politicians